= Rumini (novel series) =

Novel series by Judith Berg

- Author: Judith Berg
- Illustrator: Anna Kálmán
- Language: Hungarian
- Genre: Adventure novel
- Publisher: Pozsonyi Pagony Kft.
- Publication date: 2006
- Publication place: Hungary
- Media type: Book
- ISBN: 9789639727649

The Rumini is a novel series comprising eight parts by Hungarian writer Judith Berg. The series narrates the Wind Queen ship's voyages. The fourth volume, Diary of Fecó Collar, is written in a diary format. Rumini on the Island of Ferrites is a drama, and the Rumini on the Waters of Lights are the people's letters.

== Characters ==
- Rumini is the protagonist. An orphan whom the captain takes in onto the Wind Queen (A Sailing Ship) in order to protect him from the cops. He secretly wishes to become the most famous captain ever when he grows up. He is rather lazy and hates cleaning the deck, but will stay awake the whole night if necessary for pranks, adventures, treasure hunting or stealing sweets. He never abandons his friends. He is good at playing cards (he does cheat sometimes), and wants to eventually learn all of Collary Feco's card tricks. He is knighted for his services to the king of Hoarfrost Colony.
- Baliko is Rumini's best friend and his co-conspirator in all their misdeeds. Likes eating, but if he has to choose, he'd rather go to sleep than on adventures. He's very reliable, and it was thanks to him that Rumini wasn't sold into slavery in Fort Dormouse. He makes such contributions to the turtle people in Rumini and the four sceptres (Book 3), that he is eventually given a great award.
- Negró, the deck master.
- Benedek Bojtos, the Captain.
- Sebastian, the helmsman.
- Ajtony, the cook.
- Doctor Squeak, the ship's doctor.
- Old Man Dolman, the ship's handyman.
- Collary Feco
- Plump Bandi, a cowardly, but kind-hearted sailor.
- Roland
- Cheesy Pedro, the lookout.
- Snuff, the taciturn sailor.
- Frici
- Bruno
- Fabian

== Volumes ==
- Rumini (2006)
- Rumini in Hoarfrost Colony (2007)
- Rumini and the four scepters (2009)
- Diary of Fecó Collar (2010)
- Rumini on Beach of Date (2011)
- Rumini on Island of Ferrites (2012)
- Rumini on Waters of Lights (2013)
- Captain Rumini (2016)
